Cafedrine (INN), also known as norephedrinoethyltheophylline, is a chemical linkage of norephedrine and theophylline and is a cardiac stimulant used to increase blood pressure in people with hypotension.

See also
 Fenethylline
 Theodrenaline

References

Adenosine receptor antagonists
Substituted amphetamines
Cardiac stimulants
Norepinephrine releasing agents
Phenylethanolamines
Xanthines